The following are ranked lists of French regions. 

Population figures are from the 2016 census, with the exception of Mayotte, whose statistics are as of 2017.

Region boundaries are as of 2018.



By population
These figures are from the census in 2016. Statistics for Mayotte are from 2017.

By area
The total area of France is 632,734 km², of which 543,940 km² (86.0%) is in Europe (Metropolitan France).

By density
In 2016, the official population of France had a density of 104.8 people per square kilometre, including the overseas regions, and 118.5 people per square kilometre excluding them.

See also 
 List of French regions and overseas collectivities by GDP

References

France
List ranked
Regions, ranked